Wannabe is a British reality and talent show with Toby Anstis and ex-Big Brother housemate Chanelle Hayes, David Laudat and Roseanne McBride. It is a search for a new girl group similar to the Spice Girls consisting of five women over 25 years old.

Broadcasts
It airs on VH1 and TMF in the United Kingdom.

Format
The first episode showed auditions all over Britain. On the judging panel are music industry impresario Rosaeann McBride, who has worked with artists such as N'Sync and Britney Spears; Chanelle Hayes, celebrity vocal coach David Laudat and Spice Girls Stylist Kenny Ho. Toby Anstis was also a guest judge during the London auditions and Daryl Dennen in Liverpool.

Finalists

Pollyanna Woodward
Lisa
Celena
Sabrina
Beverley
Fiona

Three out of these girls made it to the final three, group LadyA: Sabrina, Beverly and Lisa.

See also

 Chanelle: Wannabe Popstar (TV series)

British reality television series